You're Out of Luck is a 1941 American comedy film directed by Howard Bretherton and written by Edmond Kelso. The film stars Frankie Darro, Kay Sutton, Mantan Moreland, Vickie Lester, Richard Bond and Janet Shaw. The film was released on January 20, 1941, by Monogram Pictures.

Plot
Frankie and Jeff are working in an apartment building when one of the guests is murdered, then Frankie's brother Tom turns out to be the detective in charge of the case. Tom asks the duo to keep an eye to a suspect living in the building, however they end up getting more involved than they should.

Cast          
Frankie Darro as Frankie O'Reilly
Kay Sutton as Marjorie Overton
Mantan Moreland as Jeff Jefferson
Vickie Lester as Sonya Varney 
Richard Bond as Tom O'Reilly
Janet Shaw as Joyce Dayton
Tris Coffin as Dick Whitney
Willy Castello as Johnny Burke 
Alfred Hall as Mr. Haskell
Paul Maxey as Pete
Ralph Peters as Mulligan
Paul Bryar as Benny
Jack Mather as Hymie
Gene O'Donnell as Hal Dayton
William E. Snyder as Jack

References

External links
 

1941 films
1940s English-language films
American comedy films
1941 comedy films
Monogram Pictures films
Films directed by Howard Bretherton
American black-and-white films
1940s American films